Darwin's Cathedral: Evolution, Religion, and the Nature of Society is a 2002 book by David Sloan Wilson which proposes that religion is a multi-level adaptation—i.e., a product of cultural evolution developed through multi-level selection.

Reception
The Journal of the American Academy of Religion called it "a welcome book because it unsettles everybody, evolutionary biologist and religious believer alike". Jared Diamond in the New York Review of Books called it a "thought-provoking book" which "will stimulate each reader to examine his or her personal view of religion's future".

References

2002 non-fiction books
Books about Charles Darwin
Moral psychology books
Psychology of religion